"Free" is a song by British drum and bass band Rudimental. It features the vocals from English-born Scottish singer and songwriter Emeli Sandé. The song was released in the United Kingdom on 18 November 2013 as the sixth single from their debut studio album, Home (2013). Another version of the single also features American rapper Nas; this version is featured in 2K Sports' WWE 2K15 video game.

Music video
A music video to accompany the release of "Free" was first released onto YouTube on 24 October 2013 at a total length of four minutes and thirty-two seconds. The video features real life wingsuit flier and extreme sports athlete Jokke Sommer gliding through the air around the Eiger mountain in the Alps. The video was directed by Stu Thomson and required no post-production for the stunts, with Sommer displaying his real ability on film.

Track listings

Chart performance

Weekly charts

Year-end charts

Certifications

Release history

References

2013 singles
2013 songs
Emeli Sandé songs
Nas songs
Rudimental songs
Asylum Records singles
Songs written by Amir Amor
Songs written by Emeli Sandé